is a town located on the east coast of Izu Peninsula in Kamo District, Shizuoka Prefecture, Japan. ,  the town had an estimated population of 7,203 in 3334 households, and a population density of 71 persons per km². The town is noted for its Kawazu sakura, a variety of early-blooming sakura.

Geography
Kawazu occupies a portion of the eastern coastline of Izu Peninsula, facing Sagami Bay and the Pacific Ocean. It is bordered to the west by the Amagi Mountains. The town has a temperate maritime climate characterized by hot summers and short cool winters, with the weather moderated by the effects of the warm Kuroshio current offshore. Parts of the town are within the limits of the Fuji-Hakone-Izu National Park. The area is noted for a large number of hot springs.

Neighbouring municipalities
Shizuoka Prefecture
Shimoda
Nishiizu
Matsuzaki
Ito
Higashiizu

Demographics
Per Japanese census data, the population of Kawazu has been in slow decline over the past 50 years.

Climate
The city has a climate characterized by hot and humid summers, and relatively mild winters (Köppen climate classification Cfa).  The average annual temperature in Kawazu is 16.3 °C. The average annual rainfall is 2134 mm with September as the wettest month. The temperatures are highest on average in August, at around 26.3 °C, and lowest in January, at around 7.3 °C.

History
During the Edo period, the area around Kawazu was tenryō territory controlled directly by the Tokugawa shogunate or various hatamoto. With the establishment of the modern municipalities system in 1889,  the village of Kawazu was created, along with Kamikawazu and Shimokawazu, through the merger of 15 small hamlets within Kamo District. The town of Kawazu was created through the merger of the villages of Kamikazu and Shimokawazu in September 1958.

Around March 31, 2010, the city of Shimoda and three municipalities in Kamo District (Kawazu, Matsuzaki, and Minamiizu) were scheduled to merge. However, the merger backed out.

Economy
The local economy is based on farming and tourism centered on hot spring resorts.

Education
Kawazu has three public elementary schools and one public junior high school operated by the town government. The town does not have a high school.

Transportation

Railway
 - Izu Kyūkō Line
 Imaihama-Kaigan Station, Kawazu Station

Highway

References

External links
Kawazu official website (Japanese)

 
Towns in Shizuoka Prefecture
Populated coastal places in Japan